Gilja is a village in Gjesdal municipality in Rogaland county, Norway. The Frafjord Tunnel connects Gilja with the village of Frafjord, located in the next valley on the other side of the mountains.

The village is the site of a window factory which employs many of the local inhabitants.

References

Villages in Rogaland
Gjesdal